Chelsea Elisabeth Weston (born 27 January 1990) is an English footballer who plays as a defender for Pink Bari in the Italian Serie A. She has represented England up to Under-23 level.

Club career
Weston, of Warndon, began playing football for a local boys team, the Droitwich Kestrels and remained with them until reaching the maximum age for mixed football teams. Her struggle to find a team to play for saw her featured on BBC Midlands Today where she was spotted by Birmingham City Ladies. She joined their junior side and progressed to play in their Premier League team.

Weston left to join Doncaster Rovers Belles in the 2008 close season. In February 2009 she played in the Belles 5–0 defeat against Arsenal Ladies in the FA Women's Premier League Cup Final.

In December 2010, Weston was revealed to have signed for Birmingham City Ladies' FA WSL squad. In January 2016 Birmingham manager David Parker revealed that the club had rejected its option to extend Weston's contract, making her a free agent.

On 18 March 2016, Notts County Ladies confirmed the signing of Weston.

Weston picked up an ACL injury and prior to recovery, Notts County Ladies were folded.

She signed for London Bees in September 2017 and made her debut the following month.

International career
Weston has represented England at Under-17, Under-19, and Under-20 level. In 2008, she played for England's Under-20 team in the FIFA Under-20's World Cup Finals in Chile. In 2009, she was a key player as England's Under-19s side won the UEFA European Women's Under-19 Championship in Belarus, scoring against Sweden in the group stages. She was named as one of ten 'emerging talents' from the tournament on the UEFA website.

Personal life
Weston attended Elgar Technology College and Worcester Sixth Form College, before enrolling on a sports science degree at Loughborough University, on a talented athlete scholarship.

Honours

Birmingham City
FA Women's Cup (1): 2011–12

References

External links
 
 

English women's footballers
Notts County L.F.C. players
Birmingham City W.F.C. players
Doncaster Rovers Belles L.F.C. players
Alumni of Loughborough University
FA Women's National League players
Sportspeople from Worcester, England
1990 births
Living people
Women's Super League players
England women's under-23 international footballers
London Bees players
Women's association football defenders
Coventry United W.F.C. players
A.S.D. Pink Sport Time players
Expatriate women's footballers in Italy
English expatriates in Italy